The Veterans' Memorials, Boy Scouts, Public Seals, and Other Public Expressions of Religion Protection Act of 2006 (previously the Public Expression of Religion Act of 2005), was a bill passed by the United States House of Representatives on September 26, 2006 by a vote of 244 to 173. It was not voted upon by the Senate. Its intent was two-fold. First, it would have limited the remedies for violation of Establishment Clause rights under the United States Constitution to injunctive relief and declaratory relief only. Second, it would have prevented a plaintiff in such a case from recovering attorneys' fees when they win their case.

It was criticized as a "back door" attempt to circumvent the constitution.

References

External links
, via THOMAS
, via THOMAS

Proposed legislation of the 109th United States Congress
2006 in religion
Christianity and law in the 21st century
History of veterans' affairs in the United States
Separation of church and state in the United States